Ingelinn Lossius-Skeie (born 14 December 1976) is a Norwegian politician for the Progress Party.

She served as a deputy representative to the Parliament of Norway from Aust-Agder during the term 2017–2021. She hails from Lillesand.

References

1976 births
Living people
People from Lillesand
Deputy members of the Storting
Progress Party (Norway) politicians
Aust-Agder politicians
Norwegian women in politics
Women members of the Storting